Jarqavieh Olya may refer to:
 Jarqavieh Olya District
 Jarqavieh Olya Rural District